The Kirazlık Dam is a gravity dam on the Botan River,  east of Siirt in Siirt Province of southeastern Turkey. The purpose of the dam is to regulate the outflow of the Alkumru Dam upstream and to produce hydroelectric power with a run-of-the-river design. The dam was completed in late 2011 and the power station become operational in 2013. The power plant houses three 15 MW Kaplan turbine-generators.

References

External links

Dams completed in 2011
Energy infrastructure completed in 2013
Dams in Siirt Province
Hydroelectric power stations in Turkey
Run-of-the-river power stations
Dams on the Botan River
21st-century architecture in Turkey